Uppsala may refer to:

 Uppsala city
 Gamla Uppsala, a village outside Uppsala city, important in Norse paganism
 Uppsala Airport (ICAO code ESCM)
 Uppsala County
 Uppsala County (Riksdag constituency)
 Uppsala Municipality
 Uppsala Synod, a 1593 ecclesiastical conference of the Lutheran Church of Sweden
 Uppsala University, a public university in Uppsala

See also 
 Upsala (disambiguation)
 Upsall